Svend Bille (15 July 1888 – 3 April 1973) was a Danish stage and film actor.

Filmography
Den hvide slavehandel - 1910
Balletdanserinden - 1911
Den hvide slavehandels sidste offer - 1911
Vampyrdanserinden - 1912
Atlantis - 1913
Tretten år - 1932
Odds 777 - 1932
De blaa drenge - 1933
Lynet - 1934
Week-End - 1935
En lille tilfældighed - 1939
Alle går rundt og forelsker sig - 1941
Come Home with Me - 1941
Wienerbarnet - 1941
Tag til Rønneby Kro - 1941
Wienerbarnet - 1941
Ballade i Nyhavn - 1942
Hans onsdagsveninde - 1943
En pige uden lige - 1943
Familien Gelinde - 1944
Man elsker kun een gang - 1945
Panik i familien - 1945
Penge som græs - 1948
Hvor er far? - 1948
Lejlighed til leje - 1949
Min kone er uskyldig - 1950
Som sendt fra himlen - 1951
Father of Four - 1953
Mig og min familie - 1957
Krudt og klunker - 1958
Mariannes bryllup - 1958
Helle for Helene - 1959
Paw - 1959
Skibet er ladet med - 1960
Støvsugerbanden - 1963
Vi har det jo dejligt - 1963
It's Nifty in the Navy - 1965
The Olsen Gang in a Fix - 1969

External links

Danish male stage actors
Danish male film actors
Danish male silent film actors
20th-century Danish male actors
Male actors from Copenhagen
1888 births
1973 deaths